Maria Cornelia Gezina "Mona" Keijzer (born 9 October 1968) is a Dutch politician and former civil servant. She served as State Secretary for Economic Affairs and Climate Policy alongside Dilan Yesilgöz-Zegerius from 26 October 2017 until 25 September 2021. A member of the Christian Democratic Appeal (CDA), she served in the House of Representatives between 2012 and 2017, and again for six months from 31 March 2021 until 27 September 2021. She focused on matters of nursing, home care and culture. Before becoming a full-time politician she worked as an environmental jurist for the municipalities of Waterland and Almere, as well as for the province of Gelderland.

Early life
Keijzer was born in Edam and studied juridical public administration and public law at the University of Amsterdam.

Career
Keijzer started her political career as a member of the municipal council of Waterland from 1996 to 2002 and was later an alderwoman from 1998 to 2006. Subsequently, she worked as a lawyer and mediator in 2005 and 2006. Afterwards she was an alderwoman of neighbouring municipality of Purmerend from 2007 to 2012.

In 2012, Keijzer contested the CDA leadership election in an attempt to become the party's lijsttrekker for the 2012 general election. Although performing unexpectedly well in the elections, she let Sybrand van Haersma Buma go first. Placed second on the list of candidates, Keijzer was elected to the House of Representatives, receiving 127,446 votes. She was reelected in the 2017 general election with 165,384 votes.

On 26 October 2017, Keijzer was appointed State Secretary for Economic Affairs and Climate Policy in the third Rutte cabinet. In this capacity, she was responsible for consumer policy, small and medium-sized enterprises, telecom, post and market regulation.

In a joint statement in October 2020, Keijzer and her French counterpart Cédric O called for a European Union authority to regulate large technology companies and argued that such an authority should be able to prevent digital platforms from blocking access to their services "unless they have an objective justification."

In 2020, she again contested the CDA leadership election, but came third, after Hugo de Jonge and Pieter Omtzigt. Placed seventh on the party's candidate list for the 2021 general election, Keijzer was reelected, obtaining 18,031 votes.

On 25 September 2021 Keijzer was dismissed from her cabinet position after publicly criticising the cabinet's position on COVID-19 measures. While forced resignations are not unheard of, being removed from a cabinet position has little precedent. The last time a cabinet member was fired was in 1975, although in that instance Jan Glastra van Loon was allowed to resign. Before Keijzer's discharge, no other cabinet member had actually been fired since World War II. Media outlets reported that Keijzer refused to resign. Keijzer also resigned from the House of Representatives two days later.

Personal life
Keijzer is married to a urologist and has five sons. She lives in Ilpendam and belongs to the Catholic Church. Her father-in-law is a former alderman of Waterland for the CDA.

References 

  'Mona Keijzer Frisse stratege die hard voor de troepen uitloopt; Het Dinsdagprofiel', de Volkskrant, 15 May 2012

External links 
  House of Representatives biography
 Curriculum Vitae Mona Keijzer, Government of the Netherlands

1968 births
Living people
20th-century Dutch civil servants
20th-century Dutch jurists
20th-century Dutch politicians
20th-century Dutch women politicians
21st-century Dutch jurists
21st-century Dutch lawyers
21st-century Dutch politicians
21st-century Dutch women politicians
Aldermen in North Holland
Christian Democratic Appeal politicians
Dutch Roman Catholics
Dutch women jurists
Dutch women lawyers
Members of the House of Representatives (Netherlands)
Municipal councillors in North Holland
People from Edam-Volendam
People from Purmerend
People from Waterland
State Secretaries for Economic Affairs of the Netherlands
University of Amsterdam alumni
Women government ministers of the Netherlands